The 2010 season of the Bhutanese A-Division was the sixteenth recorded season of top-flight football in Bhutan. The league was won by Yeedzin, their second title.

League table
Teams played each other on a home and away basis, there does not appear to have been any relegation in 2010 as Nangpa FC still featured in the A-Division in the next season.

Results

References

Bhutan A-Division seasons
Bhutan
Bhutan
1